If Only is a 2004 romantic fantasy drama film directed by Gil Junger and starring Jennifer Love Hewitt and Paul Nicholls.

Plot
Ian Wyndham (Nicholls) is a British businessman who lives with his American musician girlfriend, Samantha Andrews (Hewitt), in London. Taking us through a day in Ian and Samantha's life, the film opens by showing different events such as Samantha getting burnt on a kettle, Ian's watch breaking, Samantha getting Coca-Cola on her and Ian being interrupted by Samantha during an important meeting at work.

Samantha gets angry at Ian as he always treats her as his second priority and tells him that she just wants him to love her. Ian makes one last attempt to reconcile with Samantha. An angry Samantha gets into a taxi and asks Ian whether he is coming in or not. The taxi meets with an accident and Samantha dies. A heartbroken Ian goes back to his apartment, finds Samantha's notebook and opens it, finding a song she was working on. He falls asleep clutching the notebook close to him.

When he gets up the next morning, he hears Samantha talking and sees her in the bed right next to him. He is scared at first but after the initial confusion, Ian comes to the conclusion that the previous day must have been a dream. Ian feels happy to have Samantha by his side.

The events of the next day are similar to those he already experienced in the dream, although occurring at different times and in different ways. Ian is sure that he had a premonition and that the end of the day will be same and Samantha will die. Samantha gets Coca-Cola spilt on her. But Ian's watch remains in working order.  After talking to the taxi driver he realizes that the driver is the man from the dream who asks Ian to love Samantha.

After convincing her to come with him, they travel to Ian's rural home town. They climb a hill in the rain.  He asks her how she would spend her last day if she only had one left. She replies that she would spend it with him. He declares his love and they make love in a cabin. In the town below, the two have drinks and Ian tells Samantha about his father, who lost his beloved job before becoming an alcoholic and dying sometime later. The two travel back to London and Ian takes Samantha on the London Eye as another surprise. They then travel back to their apartment and Ian takes a page from her notebook and brings it to a nearby photocopying shop while Samantha travels to her concert with her violin. Before the show begins Ian gives the photocopied pages to an organizer. After the performance in which Samantha is a violinist, the organiser announces Samantha's name as the next performer. A nervous Samantha proceeds onto the stage as the orchestra begins to play the song printed on Ian's photocopied sheets. She sings the song she wrote for Ian in her notebook and the crowd burst into applause at her performance.

Instead of going to Tantra, the restaurant that Ian had made reservations for, they go to a more intimate restaurant that Samantha chooses, but Ian loves it as well.  Ian gifts her a bracelet with meaningful charms. They have a nice time. After the dinner, as both of them are standing outside of Tantra, where they ate in the dream, Ian tells Samantha why he loves her. As the taxi pulls over and Samantha gets in, she asks him again whether he is getting in or not. This time Ian gets in and sees that the cab driver is the same again. As the clock strikes 11, the taxi meets with an accident.

The same scene is repeated again, when Samantha's friend is shown running in the hospital corridor. Only this time, unlike the dream, its Samantha who is sitting and crying instead of Ian, implying that Ian died in the crash.

The film ends six months later, with Samantha packing up the apartment she shared with Ian while looking at his watch, and then performing onstage while wearing the bracelet that Ian gave her, with tears in her eyes but smiling, intercut with a scene of her finally getting to the top of the mountain that she tried to climb with Ian while stopping at the cabin that they stopped at.

Production and distribution
Filming was done between November 2002 and January 2003. The movie made its world premiere at the Sarasota Film Festival in January 2004. However it was not picked up for US distribution. It went on to play around the world throughout late 2004 and 2005. American audiences were given a chance to see this film when it premiered on the American ABC Family television network on January 15, 2006. The film premiered on UK television on the Hallmark channel, on July 28, 2009.

Production and location
Filming locations in London, where either Ian or Samantha appears include (in chronological order): Kensington Park Road where the house of Ian and Samantha is located, CityPoint where Ian works, Piccadilly where Ian is seen running towards the Méridien hotel, Westminster tube station exit, the London Eye.

Soundtrack
Hewitt performed both songs from the soundtrack, "Love Will Show You Everything" and "Take My Heart Back". She wrote "Take My Heart Back", with music by Chris Canute. Hewitt and Gil Junger co-wrote "Love Will Show You Everything", with music by Paul Englishby.

References

External links

 
 

2000s fantasy drama films
2004 romantic drama films
2000s romantic fantasy films
ABC Family original films
American fantasy drama films
American romantic drama films
American romantic fantasy films
British fantasy films
British romantic drama films
2000s English-language films
Films about road accidents and incidents
Films directed by Gil Junger
Films about time travel
Films set in London
Films shot in Cumbria
Films shot in London
Films shot in Los Angeles County, California
American drama television films
2000s American films
2000s British films